Pierpoint Isham (sometimes spelled Pierpont, Pierrepont, or Pierrepoint; August 5, 1802 – May 8, 1872) was a Vermont attorney and judge who served as an Associate Justice of the Vermont Supreme Court from 1851 to 1856.

Biography
Isham was born in Manchester, Vermont on August 5, 1802, the son of Dr. Ezra Isham and Nancy (Pierrepont) Isham.  He was raised and educated in Manchester, and at age 19 began the study of law with Richard Skinner.  He was admitted to the bar in 1823, and established a practice in Bennington and Pownal. In 1831, he received the honorary degree of Master of Arts from Middlebury College. In the 1820s and 1830s, Isham was active in the Vermont Militia and served as inspector of the 2nd Division, which was headquartered in Manchester.

In 1848, the Vermont General Assembly appointed Isham state bank commissioner, succeeding Carlos Coolidge, and he served until 1850. In 1851, Isham was appointed an associate justice of the Vermont Supreme Court.  He served until 1856, when he declined appointment to another term.

Isham moved to Piermont, New York in 1860.  He continued to practice law until his death in Piermont on May 8, 1872.  Isham was buried at Dellwood Cemetery in Manchester, Vermont.

Family
In 1831, Isham married Semantha Swift, the daughter of Dr. Noadiah Swift and Jennet Henderson of Bennington.  They were the parents of three children:

Edward Swift Isham (1836-1902), an attorney in Chicago, who practiced in partnership with Robert Todd Lincoln, and served in the Illinois House of Representatives
Mary Adeline Isham Prentice (1839-1913), the wife of Army Major Sartell Prentice
Henry Pierrepont Isham (1842-1897), a Chicago real estate broker and banker

References

Sources

Books

Newspapers

Internet

1802 births
1872 deaths
People from Manchester, Vermont
People from Bennington, Vermont
People from Piermont, New York
Vermont lawyers
New York (state) lawyers
U.S. state supreme court judges admitted to the practice of law by reading law
Justices of the Vermont Supreme Court
Burials in Vermont
19th-century American judges
19th-century American lawyers
Vermont Whigs
American militia officers